Marsham Argles (1814–1892) was the Dean of Peterborough in the Church of England from 1891 until his death a year later.

Born in County Limerick in Ireland in 1814, he was educated at Merton College, Oxford, and ordained into the priesthood in 1838. His first posts were curacies at St Peter's Church, Bolton, St Martin-in-the-Fields, London, and  Cranford, Northamptonshire after which he was appointed Vicar of Gretton. He then began a long association with Peterborough Cathedral, firstly as a Canon, then Chancellor, and finally Dean. 

He died in Southsea, near Portsmouth on 19 November 1892. His son was later a priest.

References

1814 births
Clergy from County Limerick
Alumni of Merton College, Oxford
Deans of Peterborough
1892 deaths